Ryan Allen may refer to:

 Ryan Allen (bass) (1943–2018), American bass singer
 Ryan Allen (American football) (born 1990), American football player
 Ryan Allen Carrillo (born 1975), American television personality